The Call of Silence, also screened as The Call (French: L'Appel du Silence), is a 1936 French drama film directed by Léon Poirier and starring Jean Yonnel, Pierre de Guingand and Jacqueline Francell. It is a biography based on the life of the Catholic missionary Charles de Foucauld.

Plot
Charles de Foucauld travels the Sahara as a missionary. He is killed by local bandits.

Cast 
 Jean Yonnel as Charles de Foucauld  
 Pierre de Guingand as Général Laperrine  
 Jacqueline Francell as Mademoiselle X  
 Alice Tissot as La femme du notaire  
 Suzanne Bianchetti as La femme du monde  
 Pierre Juvenet as Le colonel  
 Thomy Bourdelle as Un général 
 André Nox 
 Pierre Nay as Le marquis de Morès 
 Fred Pasquali 
 Auguste Bovério 
 Alexandre Mihalesco 
 Fernand Francell 
 Jeanne Marie-Laurent 
 Georges Cahuzac 
 Jean Kolb 
 Henri Defreyn 
 Maurice Schutz 
 Victor Vina 
 Émile Saint-Ober
 Maurice de Canonge 
 Pierre Darteuil 
 Pierre Athon as Lieutenant de Guissart 
 René Bergeron
 Jean Buquet 
 Mireille Monard as Pianist 
 Francia Seguy

References

Bibliography
 Andrews, Dudley. Mists of Regret: Culture and Sensibility in Classic French Film. Princeton University Press, 1995.

External links 
 

French biographical drama films
French historical drama films
1936 films
Films directed by Léon Poirier
1930s biographical drama films
1930s historical drama films
Films set in Algeria
Films set in deserts
1930s French-language films
Films set in the 1900s
Films set in the 1910s
French black-and-white films
1936 drama films
1930s French films